The Districts of Portugal,  are the most important first-level administrative subdivisions of continental Portugal. Currently, mainland Portugal is divided into 18 districts.

As an administrative division, each district serves mainly as the area of jurisdiction of a civil governor, who acts as the local delegate of the Central Government of Portugal.

Overview

The Districts of Portugal were established by a royal decree of 18 July 1835. On the Portuguese mainland, they correspond to the current districts, with the exception of Setúbal District, which is the result of a split of Lisbon District in 1926. This decree did not affect the then extensive colonial empire.

The 1976 Portuguese Constitution specifies that Portugal has only, as first-level divisions, the autonomous regions (Azores and Madeira) and the administrative regions (to be created in mainland Portugal). According to the Constitution, the districts shall be disestablished in territories in which an autonomous or administrative region has been created.

The districts were abolished in Azores and Madeira in 1976, when the autonomous regions were created. In 1998, a proposal was submitted to referendum to create eight administrative regions in mainland Portugal, and so to extinguish the districts. The proposal was rejected at the ballot box and so the districts continued to exist in mainland Portugal. It is worth noting that despite their abolition in the autonomous regions, the areas of the three former districts of Azores are still used as areas of jurisdiction of some government and non-government entities, like the district finance directorates (Tax Authority regional offices) and the district football championships.

However, the importance of the districts has been decreasing. In recent years, some administrative, financial and political competencies have been delivered to the CCDRs (Comissão de Coordenação e Desenvolvimento Regional, English: Commission for Regional Coordination and Development) and to the municipalities, to the detriment of the districts. In 2003, the Portuguese municipalities were allowed to organize themselves into intermunicipal communities (comunidades intermunicipais) and metropolitan areas (áreas metropolitanas), which allowed for a lessening in the importance of the districts.

Also, the abolition of the districts is a subject that returned to discussion in Portuguese society. In 2009, during the campaign for the legislative election of 2009, the leader of the Socialist Party, José Sócrates, promised a new referendum to the administrative regions and therefore, the abolition of districts, if he won the election. Other personalities support the creation of administrative regions and therefore the abolition of districts.

Despite being in the process of being phased out by the decentralisation policies of the government, the districts still remain the most relevant subdivision in the country by serving as a basis for a series of administrative divisions such as electoral constituencies, police, and civil protection regional commands; sports district associations; and championships.

On September 8, 2011, a decree from the Portuguese Government de facto extinguished all the offices of civil governor by transferring most of their functions to other bodies. As the existence of the civil governors is still included in the Portuguese Constitution, its de jure extinction may occur only after a constitutional amendment.

Present purpose
In mainland Portugal, for administrative purposes, the districts are still used as the areas of jurisdiction of the local branches and field offices of several Government ministries and agencies. Some of the bodies that have each district as their jurisdiction area are:

 District and metropolitan commands of the Public Security Police;
 Territorial commands of the Portuguese National Republican Guard;
 District rescue operations commands of the National Civil Protection Authority;
 Finance directorates of the Ministry of Finance / Tax and Customs Authority (in this case, including the former districts of Azores, that are still used as the jurisdiction areas for the three finance directorates existing in this autonomous region);
 District Social Security centers of the Portuguese Social Security;
 District motor vehicle delegations of the Mobility and Land Transports Institute;
 District archives of the Directorate-General of Archives;
 Regional delegations of the Estradas de Portugal (Road Agency).

Furthermore:

 The area of each of the 18 electoral constituencies (círculo eleitoral, electoral circle) of mainland Portugal coincides with the area of each district;
 In the new judicial division of Portugal, the area of each of the comarcas (first instance judicial districts) of mainland Portugal coincides with the area of an administrative district (with the exception of the comarcas of Greater Lisbon and Greater Oporto).

For non-Government purposes, the districts are used as the area of jurisdiction of many entities, including:

 The regional organizations of the major political parties, 
 The regional organizations of most of the Portuguese sports federations (football, athletics, roller skating, etc.) and its district championships (including the three former districts of Açores);
 Regional federations of trade unions;
 District delegations of the Institutions of Engineers.

List

Former districts of Portugal

Azores
 Angra do Heroísmo District – 1835 to 1976
 Horta District – 1835 to 1976
 Ponta Delgada District – 1835 to 1976

Madeira
  – 1835 to 1976

Mainland Portugal
 Lamego District – in 1835 and 1919

Districts of the Portuguese Overseas
Following the model of European Portugal, the major Portuguese overseas territories (Angola, Mozambique and Portuguese India) were also divided in districts. In these territories, each district was headed by a district governor, subordinated to the governor-general. In Angola and Mozambique, the former district areas mostly coincide with the modern province areas. In the former Portuguese India, the Damão and Diu districts are still divisions of the present union territory of Daman and Diu, while the present state of Goa (former Goa District) is now divided into two districts.

Angola 
 Bengo
 Benguela District
 Bié
 Cabinda
 Cuando-Cubango District
 Cuanza Norte District
 Cuanza Sul District
 Cunene
 Huambo District
 Huíla
 Luanda District
 Lunda Norte District
 Lunda Sul District
 Malanje District
 Moxico
 Moçâmedes District
 Uíge District
 Zaire District

Mozambique 
 Niassa District
 Cabo Delgado District
 Nampula District
 Zambézia District
 Tete District
 Manica District
 Sofala District
 Gaza District
 Inhambane District
 Lourenço Marques District

Portuguese India 
 Goa District
 Damão District
 Diu District

See also
 Ranked list of Portuguese districts
 Subdivisions of Portugal

References
Notes

Sources
 
 

 
Subdivisions of Portugal
Districts
Portugal 1
Districts, Portugal